Rubus regionalis is a North American species of bristleberry in section Setosi of the genus Rubus, a member of the rose family. It grows in eastern and central Canada (Ontario, Québec, New Brunswick) and the north-central and northeastern United States (Minnesota, Wisconsin, Michigan, New York, Vermont, New Hampshire, and Maine).

R. regionalis grows in surface-dry to wet ecotonal (transitional) communities between shallow wetlands or brushlands and forested uplands dominated by pines (Pinus) or quaking aspen (Populus tremuloides). These habitats are sedgy, grassy, brushy, or sometimes mossy. It forms small intertangled colonies in full sunlight to partial shade.

References

regionalis
Plants described in 1932
Flora of Canada
Flora of the United States